Sfinks ("Sphynx" in some languages) may refer to:

SFINKS, a stream cypher algorithm, in cryptography
Nagroda Sfinks (Sphynx Award), a former name of the Janusz A. Zajdel Award in science fiction fandom
Sfinks festival, Belgian festival for world music
, Polish science fiction magazine